John Albert Gamble QC, LLB (November 24, 1933 – May 11, 2009) was a Canadian politician. He was elected to the House of Commons of Canada as a Progressive Conservative in the 1979 federal election defeating then Liberal incumbent Barney Danson and re-elected in the 1980 election, representing the riding of York North.

He was a candidate at the 1983 Progressive Conservative leadership convention, but won only 17 votes. Gamble was known for his extreme anti-communist views. He became so unpopular that he was one of only two Progressive Conservative Members of Parliament to lose their seat in the 1984 general election, which produced a Progressive Conservative landslide, the largest majority in the history of the Canadian House of Commons. (Bill Clarke of Vancouver Quadra was the other but he lost to Prime Minister John Turner who needed a seat in the House.) Gamble was defeated by independent candidate Tony Roman, who was supported by Liberals dissatisfied with their candidate and Tories who wanted to defeat Gamble.

After failing to win a nomination as a Progressive Conservative candidate for the new riding of Markham, Gamble ran as an independent in the 1988 election, winning less than five percent of the vote losing to Progressive Conservative candidate Bill Attewell. On May 31, 1993, Gamble won the Reform Party's nomination in Don Valley West for the 1993 federal election, but was expelled by the party (Gamble was replaced by Julian Pope who lost to John Godfrey) prior to the election because of his links to far-right extremists such as Paul Fromm, Ron Gostick, Wolfgang Droege, and the Heritage Front.

In the 1980s, Gamble was involved with the hard-right World Anti-Communist League as head of its affiliate the "Canadian Freedom Foundation".  According to a report by the Security Intelligence Review Committee, Paul Fromm assisted Gamble in this WACL work.

Personal

Gamble was born in Perth and became a tax lawyer before his political career and was director of the Unionville Home Society. He died in 2009 from leukemia in Markham, Ontario.

Archives 
There is a John Albert Gamble fonds at Library and Archives Canada. Archival reference number is R3936.

References

External links

1933 births
2009 deaths
20th-century Canadian politicians
Members of the House of Commons of Canada from Ontario
Progressive Conservative Party of Canada MPs
Canadian anti-communists
People from Markham, Ontario
Progressive Conservative Party of Canada leadership candidates